Jiangsu (pinyin: Jiāngsū, alternatively romanized as Kiangsu or Chiangsu) is an eastern coastal province of the People's Republic of China. It is one of the leading provinces in finance, education, technology, and tourism, with its capital in Nanjing. Jiangsu is the third smallest, but the fifth most populous and the most densely populated of the 23 provinces of the People's Republic of China. Jiangsu has the highest GDP per capita of Chinese provinces and second-highest GDP of Chinese provinces, after Guangdong. Jiangsu borders Shandong in the north, Anhui to the west, and Zhejiang and Shanghai to the south. Jiangsu has a coastline of over  along the Yellow Sea, and the Yangtze River passes through the southern part of the province.

Since the Sui and Tang dynasties, Jiangsu has been a national economic and commercial center, partly due to the construction of the Grand Canal. Cities such as Nanjing, Suzhou, Wuxi, Changzhou, and Shanghai (separated from Jiangsu in 1927) are all major Chinese economic hubs. Since the initiation of economic reforms in 1990, Jiangsu has become a focal point for economic development. It is widely regarded as one of China's most developed provinces, when measured by its Human Development Index (HDI). Its 2021 nominal GDP per capita reached RMB 137,300 (US$21,287), becoming the first province in China to reach $20,000 mark.

Jiangsu is home to many of the world's leading exporters of electronic equipment, chemicals and textiles. It has also been China's largest recipient of foreign direct investment since 2006. Its 2021 nominal GDP was more than RMB 11.64 trillion (US$1.80 trillion), which is the fifth-highest of all country subdivisions. If it were a country, it would be the tenth-largest economy as of 2021 as well as the 19th most populous.

Jiangsu is also one of the leading provinces in research and education in China. As of 2022, Jiangsu hosts 168 institutions of higher education, ranking first of all Chinese provinces. Jiangsu has many highly ranked educational institutions, with 16 number of universities listed in the Double First-Class Universities, ranking second after Beijing. As of 2020, two major cities in Jiangsu ranked in the world's top 50 (Nanjing 8th and Suzhou 45th) cities by scientific research output, as tracked by the Nature Index.

Name
Jiangsu's name is a compound of the first elements of the names of the two cities of Jiangning (now Nanjing) and Suzhou. The abbreviation for this province is "", the second character of its name.

History
During the earliest Chinese dynasties, the area that is now Jiangsu was far away from the center of Chinese civilization, which was in the northwest Henan; it was home of the Huai Yi, an ancient ethnic group. During the Zhou dynasty more contact was made, and eventually the state of Wu appeared in southern Jiangsu, one of the many hundreds of states that existed across northern and central China at that time. Near the end of the Spring and Autumn period, Wu became a great power under King Helu of Wu, and defeated in 484 BC the state of Qi, a major power in the north in modern-day Shandong province, and contest for the position of overlord over all states of China. The state of Wu was subjugated in 473 BC by the state of Yue, another state that had emerged to the south in modern-day Zhejiang province. Yue was in turn subjugated by the powerful state of Chu from the west in 333 BC. Eventually the state of Qin swept away all the other states, and unified China in 221 BC.

Under the reign of the Han dynasty (206 BC to 220 AD), Jiangsu was removed from the centers of civilization in the North China Plain, and was administered under two zhou (provinces): Xu Province in the north, and Yang Province in the south. During the Three Kingdoms period, southern Jiangsu became the base of the Eastern Wu (222 to 280), whose capital, Jianye (later renamed to Jiankang), is modern Nanjing. When nomadic invasions overran northern China in the 4th century, the imperial court of the Jin dynasty moved to Jiankang. Cities in southern and central Jiangsu swelled with the influx of migrants from the north. Jiankang remained as the capital for four successive Southern dynasties and became the largest commercial and cultural center in China.

After the Sui dynasty united the country in 581, the political center of the country shifted back to the north, but the Grand Canal was built through Jiangsu to link the Central Plain with the prosperous Yangtze Delta. The Tang dynasty (618–907) relied on southern Jiangsu for annual deliveries of grain. It was during the Song dynasty (960–1279), which saw the development of a wealthy mercantile class and emergent market economy in China, that Jiangnan (southern Jiangsu, Shanghai, and adjacent areas) emerged as a center of trade. From then onwards, major cities like Suzhou or Yangzhou, would be synonymous with opulence and luxury in China. Today the region remains one of the richest parts of China.

The Jurchen Jin dynasty gained control of North China in 1127 during the Jin-Song wars, and Huai River, which used to cut through north Jiangsu to reach the Yellow Sea, was the border between the north, under the Jin, and the south, under the Southern Song dynasty. The Mongols took control of China in the thirteenth century. The Ming dynasty, which was established in 1368 after driving out the Mongols who had occupied China, initially put its capital in Nanjing. Regions surrounding Nanjing, corresponding to Jiangsu and Anhui today, were designated as the Nanzhili province (literally "southern directly governed"). Following a coup by Zhu Di (later, the Yongle Emperor), however, the capital was moved to Beijing, far to the north, although Nanjing kept its status as the southern capital. In late Ming, Jiangnan continued to be an important center of trade in China; some historians see in the flourishing textiles industry at the time incipient industrialization and capitalism, a trend that was however aborted.

The Qing dynasty converted Nanzhili to "Jiangnan province"; in 1666 Jiangsu and Anhui were split apart as separate provinces. Jiangsu's borders have been for the most part stable since then.

With the start of the Western incursion into China in the 1840s, the rich and mercantile Yangtze river delta was increasingly exposed to Western influence; Shanghai, originally an unremarkable little town of Jiangsu, quickly developed into a metropolis of trade, banking, and cosmopolitanism, and was split out later as an independent municipality. Jiangnan also figures strongly in the Taiping Rebellion (18511864), a massive and deadly rebellion that attempted to set up a Christian theocracy in China; it started far to the south, in Guangdong province, swept through much of South China, and by 1853, had established Nanjing as its capital, renamed as Tianjing ( "Heavenly Capital").

The Republic of China was established in 1912, and China was soon torn apart by warlords. Jiangsu changed hands several times, but in April 1927, Chiang Kai-shek established a government at Nanking; he was soon able to bring most of China under his control. This was however interrupted by the second Sino-Japanese War, which began full-scale in 1937; on December 13, 1937, Nanjing fell, and the combined atrocities of the occupying Japanese for the next three months would come to be known as the Nanjing Massacre. Nanjing was the seat of the collaborationist government of East China under Wang Jingwei, and Jiangsu remained under Japanese occupation until the end of the war in 1945.

After the war, Nanking was once again the capital of the Republic of China, though now the Chinese Civil War had broken out between the Kuomintang government and Communist forces, based further north, mostly in Northeast China. The decisive Huaihai Campaign was fought in northern Jiangsu; it resulted in Kuomintang defeat, and the communists were soon able to cross the Yangtze River and take Nanking. The Kuomintang fled southward and eventually ended up in Taipei, from which the Republic of China government continues to administer Taiwan, Pescadores, and its neighboring islands, though it also continues to claim (technically, at least) Nanjing as its rightful de jure capital.

After the communist takeover, Peking (formerly Peiping, later spelled as Beijing) was made capital of the People's Republic, and Nanjing was demoted to be the provincial capital of Jiangsu. The economic reforms of Deng Xiaoping initially focused on the south coast of China, in Guangdong province, which soon left Jiangsu behind; starting from the 1990s they were applied more evenly to the rest of China. Suzhou and Wuxi, two southern cities of Jiangsu in close proximity to neighboring Shanghai, have since become particularly prosperous, being among the top 10 cities in China in terms of gross domestic product and outstripping the provincial capital of Nanjing. The income disparity between northern and southern Jiangsu however remains large.

Geography

Jiangsu is flat, with plains covering 68 percent of its total area (water covers another 18 percent). The southern city of Suzhou has so many canals that it has been dubbed "Venice of the East" or the "Venice of the Orient." The Grand Canal of China cuts through Jiangsu from north to south, crossing all the east–west river systems. Jiangsu also borders the Yellow Sea. The Yangtze River, the longest river of China, cuts through the province in the south and reaches the East China Sea, which divides the region into two parts: more urban, prosperous south and more poorer, rural north, and these two parts has a tense division.
Large lakes in Jiangsu include Lake Tai (the largest), Lake Hongze, Lake Gaoyou, Lake Luoma, and Lake Yangcheng.

Before 1194 A.D., the Huai River cut through north Jiangsu to reach the Yellow Sea. The Huai River is a major river in central China, and it was the traditional border between North China and South China. Since 1194 A.D., the Yellow River further to the north changed its course several times, running into the Huai River in north Jiangsu each time instead of its other usual path northwards into Bohai Bay. The silting caused by the Yellow River was so heavy that after its last episode of "hijacking" the Huai River ended in 1855: the Huai River was no longer able to go through its usual path into the sea. Instead it flooded, pooled up (thereby forming and enlarging Lake Hongze and Lake Gaoyou), and flowed southwards through the Grand Canal into the Yangtze. The old path of the Huai River is now marked by a series of irrigation channels, the most significant of which is the North Jiangsu Main Irrigation Canal, which channels a small amount of the water of the Huai River alongside south of its old path into the sea.

Most of Jiangsu has a humid subtropical climate (Cfa or Cwa in the Köppen climate classification), beginning to transition into a humid continental climate (Köppen Dwa) in the far north. Rain falls frequently between spring and summer (meiyu), typhoons with rainstorms occur in late summer and early autumn. As with the rest of the coast, tornados are possible.

Major cities:

 Nanjing
 Suzhou
 Wuxi
 Xuzhou
 Changzhou
 Yangzhou
 Lianyungang
 Yancheng
 Zhenjiang
 Nantong
 Huai'an
 Taizhou
 Suqian

Administrative divisions

Jiangsu is divided into thirteen prefecture-level divisions, all prefecture-level cities (including a sub-provincial city):

These prefecture-level cities are in turn subdivided into 98 county-level divisions (55 districts, 21 county-level cities, and 20 counties). Those are in turn divided into 1,488 township-level divisions (1,078 towns, 122 townships, one ethnic township, and 287 subdistricts). At the end of the year 2017, the total population is 80.29 million.

Urban areas

Politics

The politics of Jiangsu is structured in a one party (Communist) government system like all other governing institutions in mainland China.

The Governor of Jiangsu is the highest-ranking official in the People's Government of Jiangsu. However, in the province's dual party-government governing system, the Governor has less power than the Jiangsu Chinese Communist Party Provincial Committee Secretary, colloquially termed the "Jiangsu CCP Party Chief."

Economy

As of 2021, Jiangsu had a gross domestic product (GDP) in nominal of RMB 11.64 trillion (US$1.80 trillion), the second-highest in China after Guangdong. Its GDP is greater than those of South Korea and Russia which are the world's 10th- and 11th-largest economies respectively. Jiangsu's GDP by nominal is greater than the GDPs of all other BRICS states, except India. In 2021, Jiangsu's economy by Purchasing Power Parity reached US$2.83 trillion, making it the 3rd-largest of any country subdivision globally, behind California and Guangdong. Jiangsu's economy in PPP also exceeded that of Italy with a GDP PPP of US$ $2.71 trillion, the 11th largest in the world.

Jiangsu is very wealthy among the provinces of China. Its 2021 nominal GDP per capita reached RMB 137,300 (US$21,287), becoming the first province in China to reach $20,000 mark. Cities like Nanjing, Suzhou, and Wuxi have GDPs per capita around twice the provincial average, making south Jiangsu one of the most prosperous regions in China.

The province has an extensive irrigation system supporting its agriculture, which is based primarily on rice and wheat, followed by maize and sorghum. Main cash crops include cotton, soybeans, peanuts, rapeseed, sesame, ambary hemp, and tea. Other products include peppermint, spearmint, bamboo, medicinal herbs, apples, pears, peaches, loquats, ginkgo. Silkworms form an important part of Jiangsu's agriculture, with the Lake Tai region to the south a major base of silk production in China. Jiangsu is an important producer of freshwater fish and other aquatic products.

Jiangsu has coal, petroleum, and natural gas deposits, but its most significant mineral products are non-metal minerals such as halite (rock salt), sulfur, phosphorus, and marble. The city of Xuzhou is a coal hub of China. The salt mines of Huaiyin have more than 0.4 trillion tonnes of deposits, one of the greatest collections of deposits in China.

Jiangsu is historically oriented toward light industries such as textiles and food industry. Since 1949, Jiangsu has developed heavy industries such as chemical industry and construction materials. Jiangsu's important industries include machinery, electronic, chemicals, and automobile. The government has worked hard to promote the solar industry and hoped by 2012 the solar industry would be worth 100 billion RMB. Jiangsu's economy growth has directly benefited from the reform Chinese's policies, and its growth trajectory reflects that of many other coastal provinces, such as Zhejiang and Shandong. The economic reforms of Deng Xiaoping have greatly benefited southern cities, especially Suzhou and Wuxi, which outstrip the provincial capital, Nanjing, in total output. In the eastern outskirts of Suzhou, Singapore has built the Suzhou Industrial Park, a flagship of Sino-Singaporean cooperation and the only industrial park in China that is in its entirety the investment of a single foreign country.

Jiangsu contains over 100 different economic and technological development zones devoted to different types of investments.

Demographics

The majority of Jiangsu residents are ethnic Han Chinese. Other minorities include the Hui and the Manchus.

 Demographic indicators in 2000
Population: 74.058 million (urban: 34.637 million; rural: 39.421 million) (2003) 
Birth rate: 9.04 per 1000 (2003) 
Death rate: 7.03 per 1000 (2003) 
Sex ratio: 102.55 males per 100 females 
Average family size: 3.25 
Han Chinese proportion: 99.64% 
Literacy rate: 97.88%

Religion 

The predominant religions in Jiangsu are Chinese folk religions, Taoist traditions and Chinese Buddhism. According to surveys conducted in 2007 and 2009, 16.67% of the population believes and is involved in cults of ancestors, while 2.64% of the population identifies as Christian. The reports didn't give figures for other types of religion; 80.69% of the population may be either irreligious or involved in worship of nature deities, Buddhism, Confucianism, Taoism, folk religious sects, and small minorities of Muslims.

In 2010, there are 130,757 Muslims in Jiangsu.

Transportation
Jiangsu is home to one of the most extensive transportation networks in China.

Air
Nanjing Lukou International Airport  serves as the major airport in the province, with flights to Tokyo, Osaka, Hong Kong, Seoul-Incheon, Frankfurt, Bangkok, Milan, Vancouver and Los Angeles. Other passenger airports include Sunan Shuofang International Airport, Changzhou Benniu Airport, Yangzhou Taizhou International Airport, and Nantong Xingdong Airport. Air traffic in the populated Suzhou area is often diverted to Shanghai Hongqiao International Airport, to which Suzhou is conveniently connected to via bus services and by expressway.

Xuzhou Guanyin International Airport, Yancheng Nanyang International Airport, and Lianyungang Baitabu Airport serve as hubs in northern Jiangsu.

Rail

The southern part of the province, namely the Shanghai-Nanjing corridor, has very high-frequency rail services. Jiangsu is in route of the Jinghu railway from Beijing to Shanghai, as well as the high speed line between the two cities: Shanghai–Nanjing intercity railway and Beijing-Shanghai high-speed railway, completed in 2010 and 2011, respectively. Since the completion of the Beijing-Shanghai high-speed line, travel time between Beijing and Nanjing has been reduced to approximately four hours (from eleven hours previously); travel time between Nanjing and Shanghai on the fastest high-speed trains takes just over an hour.

As of 2022, all major cities in Jiangsu have been connected by high-speed lines, including: Shanghai-Nanjing intercity railway since 2010, Beijing-Shanghai high-speed railway since 2011, Nanjing–Hangzhou high-speed railway since 2013, Nanjing–Anqing intercity railway since 2015, Lianyungang–Zhenjiang high-speed railway since 2020, Xuzhou–Yancheng high-speed railway since 2019, Yancheng–Nantong high-speed railway since 2020, Shanghai–Suzhou–Nantong railway since 2020, and Lianyungang–Xuzhou high-speed railway since 2021.

Road
Jiangsu's road network is one of the most developed in the country. The Beijing–Shanghai Expressway (G2) enters the province from the north and passes through Huai'an, Yangzhou, Taizhou, and Wuxi on the way to Shanghai; travelling from Shanghai westbound, G2 forks at Wuxi and continues onto Nanjing separately as G42, the Shanghai–Nanjing Expressway, which serves the widely travelled southern corridor of the province. The Ningchang Expressway links Nanjing with Changzhou. The Suzhou area is extensively networked with expressways, going in all directions. The Yanhai Expressway links the coastal regions of the province, passing through Nantong, Yancheng, and Lianyungang.

Historically, the province was divided by the Yangtze River into northern and southern regions. The first bridge across the river in Jiangsu, the Nanjing Yangtze River Bridge, was completed in 1968 during the Cultural Revolution. The second bridge crossing, Jiangyin Bridge, opened 30 years later at Jiangyin. As of October 2014, there were 11 cross-Yangtze bridges in the province, including the five in Nanjing, which also has two cross-river tunnels. The Jiangyin Bridge, Runyang Bridge (opened in 2005, connecting Yangzhou and Zhenjiang), and Fourth Nanjing Bridge (opened in 2012) all rank among the ten longest suspension bridges in the world.

Metro (subway)
As of December 2022, Jiangsu has six cities that have operational subway systems, together with an extra city (Huai'an) currently under construction. These six cities are Nanjing, Suzhou, Wuxi, Changzhou, Xuzhou and Nantong.

The Nanjing Metro was opened in September 2005. It was the sixth city in Mainland China that opened up a metro system. As of December 2019 the city currently has 11 metro lines (Line 1, Line 2, Line 3, Line 4, Line 10, Line S1, Line S3, Line S6, Line S7, Line S8 and Line S9), with several extra ones (i.e. Line 5) under construction.

The Suzhou Rail Transit, also known as the Suzhou Metro, was opened in April 2012. As of October, 2022, it currently has five operational lines: Line 1, Line 2, Line 3, Line 4 and Line 5. It also has four other lines under construction (Line 6, Line 7, Line 8, Line S1) and 11 lines under planning (Lines 9, 10, 11 through 16, Line 18, Line 20, Line S4, Line S5). Currently under construction lines are expected to be operational by 2024 and planned lines are expected to be operational by 2035.

The Wuxi Metro was opened in July 2014. The system is currently composed of four operational lines by 2022: Line 1, Line 2, Line 3 and Line 4. It also has two other lines under construction: Line S1 and an extension of Line 4.

The Changzhou Metro was opened in September 2019. The system currently only has two lines operational, Line 1 and Line 2.

The Xuzhou Metro was opened in September 2019, a few days after the Changzhou Metro started operations. The system currently only has three lines operational, Line 1, Line 2 and Line 3.

The Nantong Metro was opened in November 2022. It has one operating line: Line 1 and another line under construction: Line 2.

The Huai'an Metro, also known as the Huai'an Rail System, began construction in November 2018. There are seven lines planned: Line 1, Line 2, Line 3, Line 4, Line 5, Line S1, and Line S2. It is expected to start operations before 2025.

Culture
The four mass migrations in the 4th, 8th, 12th and 14th centuries had been influential in shaping the regional culture of Jiangsu. According to dialects and the other factors, the province can be roughly segmented four major cultural subdivisions: Wu, Jinling, Huaiyang and Xuhuai, from southeast to northwest. The belts of transition blurred the boundaries.

Jiangsu is rich in cultural traditions. Kunqu, originating in Kunshan, is one of the most renowned and prestigious forms of Chinese opera. Pingtan, a form of storytelling accompanied by music, is also popular: it can be subdivided into types by origin: Suzhou Pingtan (of Suzhou), Yangzhou Pingtan (of Yangzhou), and Nanjing Pingtan (of Nanjing). Wuxi opera, a form of traditional Chinese opera, is popular in Wuxi, while Huaiju is popular further north, around Yancheng. Jiangsu cuisine is one of the eight great traditions of the cuisine of China.

Suzhou is also well known for its silk, Chinese embroidery, jasmine tea, stone bridges, pagodas, and classical gardens. Nearby Yixing is noted for its teaware while Yangzhou is known for its lacquerware and jadeware. Nanjing's yunjin is a noted type of woven silk.

Since ancient times, south Jiangsu has been famed for its prosperity and opulence, and simply inserting south Jiangsu place names (Suzhou, Yangzhou, etc.) into poetry gave an effect of dreaminess, as was indeed done by many famous poets. In particular, the fame of Suzhou (as well as Hangzhou in neighbouring Zhejiang) has led to the popular saying:  ("above there is heaven; below there are Suzhou and Hangzhou"), a saying that continues to be a source of pride for the people of these two still prosperous cities. Similarly, the prosperity of Yangzhou has led poets to dream of:  ("with a hundred thousand strings of coins wrapped around its waist, a crane landed in Yangzhou").

Education

Higher education 

As of 2022, Jiangsu hosts 168 institutions of higher education, ranking first of all Chinese provinces. There are two Project 985, 11 Project 211, and 16 Double First Class universities in the province. A combination of 93 members of Chinese Academy of Sciences and Chinese Academy of Engineering work in Jiangsu. As of 2020, two major cities in Jiangsu ranked in the world's top 50 (Nanjing 8th and Suzhou 45th) cities by scientific research output, as tracked by the Nature Index.

Double First Class Universities in Jiangsu 

Other Major Research Universities in Jiangsu
 Jiangsu University
 Jiangsu Normal University
 Yangzhou University
 Nanjing Tech University
 Jiangsu University of Science and Technology
 Changzhou University
 Nantong University
 Suzhou University of Science and Technology
 Nanjing Institute of Technology
 Huaiyin Institute of Technology

Additional schools 
 Nanjing Jinling High School
 Tianyi middle School
 Xishan Senior High School
 Qianhuang Senior High School
 School of Foreign Languages and Cultures of NNU

Tourism
Nanjing was the capital of several Chinese dynasties and contains a variety of historic sites, such as the Purple Mountain, Purple Mountain Observatory, the Sun Yat-sen Mausoleum, Ming dynasty city wall and gates, Ming Xiaoling Mausoleum (the mausoleum of the first Ming Emperor, Hongwu Emperor), Xuanwu Lake, Jiming Temple, the Nanjing Massacre Memorial, Nanjing Confucius Temple, Nanjing Yangtze River Bridge, and the Nanjing Zoo, along with its circus. Suzhou is renowned for its classical gardens (designated as a UNESCO World Heritage Site), as well as the Hanshan Temple, and Huqiu Tower. Nearby is the water-town of Zhouzhuang, an international tourist destination with Venice-like waterways, bridges and dwellings, which have been preserved over centuries. Yangzhou is known for Slender West Lake. Wuxi is known for being the home of the world's tallest Buddha statue. In the north, Xuzhou is designated as one of China's "eminent historical cities." The official travel and tourism website for Jiangsu was set up in 2008.
 Lion Garden in Suzhou
 Grand Buddha at Ling Shan, Wuxi
 Chaotian Palace
 Qixia Temple
 Tianning Temple Pagoda
 Tombs of Southern Tang Emperor
 Yangzhong Puffer Fish

Sports

Professional sports teams in Jiangsu include:
 Chinese Super League
 Kunshan F.C.
 Nantong Zhiyun F.C.
 China League One
 Nanjing City F.C.
 Suzhou Dongwu F.C.
 China League Two
 Wuxi Wugo F.C.
 Chinese Basketball Association
 Jiangsu Dragons
 Nanjing Monkey King
 Chinese Volleyball League
 Jiangsu Zenith Steel
 China Baseball League
 Jiangsu Pegasus

International relations

Twin Provinces

Twin towns and sister cities
 Nanjing with  Aichi, Japan

See also

 Major national historical and cultural sites in Jiangsu
 Jiangsu-Hong Kong Personnel Training Cooperation Programme

Notes

References

Citations

Sources

 Economic profile for Jiangsu at HKTDC

External links

 Jiangsu Government website 
 Jiangsu Government website 
 Complete Map of the Seven Coastal Provinces from 1821 to 1850 

 
East China
Provinces of the People's Republic of China
Yangtze River Delta